Chřibský hrádek (older name Karlštejn;  or Wüstes Schloss) is a ruined rock castle in Doubice in the Ústí nad Labem Region of the Czech Republic. It is located in the Elbe Sandstone Mountains.

Location
Chřibský hrádek Castle lies in the southernmost tip of the municipal territory of Doubice near its border with the town of Chřibská. It is located in the Elbe Sandstone Mountains, in the Lusatian Mountains Protected Landscape Area near its border with the Bohemian Switzerland National Park. The castle is situated on a rock outcrop in the valley of the Doubický Stream not far from the isolated gamekeeper's house of Hájovna Saula (also U Sloupu) that, today, houses an information office for the Bohemian Switzerland National Park.

History
The castle was founded by the Michalovice family in the second half of the 13th century to protect a trade route to Lusatia. It was burned down during the Hussite Wars (1419–1434).

See also
List of castles in the Czech Republic

References

Literature
 Anděl, Rudolf (et al.): Hrady, zámky a tvrze v Čechách, na Moravě a ve Slezsku. Bd. III : Severní Čechy. Svoboda, Prague, 1984
 Klos, Richard: Die sechs Felsenburgen in der Böhmischen Schweiz. In: Sächsische Heimatblätter Heft 3/1968, pp. 97–103

External links
 Description of Chřibský hrádek
 Old description of Karlstein 
 Chřibský hrádek at hrady.cz 

Elbe Sandstone Mountains
Castles in the Czech Republic
Děčín District
Castles in the Ústí nad Labem Region
Rock castles
Ruined castles in the Czech Republic